Three of the following defunct Commonwealth of Massachusetts police agencies (Registry of Motor Vehicles Division of Law Enforcement, Massachusetts Capitol Police, Metropolitan District Commission Police) were merged in 1992 by Chapter 412 of the Massachusetts Acts of 1991 along with the former Department of Public Safety - Division of State Police to form the current Department of State Police. All officers of the three departments became Massachusetts State Troopers at the time of the merger without needing to attend the Massachusetts State Police Academy.

Boston Municipal Police
The Boston Municipal Police were founded in 1979 and had full city-wide police powers in the City of Boston as Special Police Officers. However, the officers of the department were primarily tasked with patrol of city buildings and public property as well as responding to security alarms. The department was dissolved on January 1, 2007 and replaced by the Boston Municipal Protective Services, an unarmed security force. Officers of the Municipal Protective Services still hold arrest powers as Special Police Officers but the vast majority of law enforcement activity previously handled by the Boston Municipal Police is now the responsibility of the Boston Police Department.

Department of Public Safety - Division of State Police
This is the former statewide police department for the Commonwealth of Massachusetts, which was founded in 1865; the M.D.C. Police, Registry of Motor Vehicles Police, and Capitol Police merged with this department to form the new Department of State Police in 1992. Prior to being known as the Massachusetts State Police, the department was known as the Special District Police of Massachusetts from 1879 to 1919.

Registry of Motor Vehicles Division of Law Enforcement

The Registry Police had the primary function of enforcing motor vehicle safety laws statewide, drivers license testing, crash investigation, enforcing laws & regulations on Registry property, and commercial vehicle inspection. Officers of the Registry Police were unique in the fact that as Registry employees they were able to suspend an operator's license on the roadside.

The Registry Police Statewide HQ was located at 100 Nashua St., Boston.

Massachusetts Capitol Police 

The Capitol Police had the primary function of law enforcement on the grounds and adjacent streets of the State Capitol and all state property. The Capitol police provided vehicle cruiser, motorcycle and traffic patrols, criminal investigations and executive protection services. The Capitol Police station was at 1 Ashburton Place in Government Center and became MSP Barracks H-1.

Metropolitan District Commission Police

The Metropolitan District Commission's Police Department; the Massachusetts Metro Police was created in 1893. The Metropolitan Police had the primary jurisdiction of law enforcement on all MDC controlled properties, roadways and all Massachusetts Water Resources Authority (MWRA) facilities, Reservoirs and Watersheds. Additionally, the MDC Police had patrol jurisdiction on US Route 1 in Chelsea and Revere, Interstate 93 in Boston and Milton (Central Artery and the Southeast Expressway). MDC Police also had full jurisdiction with communities throughout Greater Boston.

MDC Police were the third largest police agency in New England with over six hundred officers working primarily throughout Metropolitan Boston. They were commonly referred to as The Mets. In addition to patrol functions The Mets provided tactical assistance to area cities and towns in the form of regional SWAT teams, the Marine Unit and tactical operations units. Examples include Tactical Officers assigned to the city of Boston during court ordered school desegregation, assignment as the primary security agency for the Department of State with the responsibility of providing security and escorts for visiting dignitaries and annual assignments to assist cities and towns during the Boston Marathon.

MDC Police also maintained a full service detective unit to investigate crimes on its primary jurisdiction as well as providing Detectives and undercover agents to area cities and towns, area Drug Task Forces, the (state) Governor's Auto Theft Strike Force, the DEA Boston Drug Task Force, the Secret Service and the FBI.

The last chief of the MDC Police was former Boston Police Commissioner William J. Bratton, who later was NYPD Commissioner and Los Angeles Police Department chief.

The following current Massachusetts State Police Barracks were MDC Police districts: MSP Barracks A4 − Medford (Middlesex Fells District); MSP Barracks A5 − Revere (Revere Beach); MSP Barracks H4 − Boston, next to Museum of Science (Lower Basin District); MSP Barracks H5 − Brighton on Soldiers Field Rd (Upper Basin District); MSP Barracks H6 − South Boston (Old Colony District); MSP H7 − Milton (Blue Hills District); MSP Barracks C7 − Belchertown (Quabbin District).

Additionally, the following State Police Units are based out of former MDC Police facilities:

MSP Marine Unit (New Charles River Dam, Boston); MSP Canine Unit (Pond St., Stoneham).

The following former MDC police stations were closed in the first few years after the consolidation: Wachusett District (Wachusett and Sudbury Reservoirs and Watersheds); Nantasket Beach District (Nantasket Beach, Hull); Nahant Beach Substation (Nahant Beach); Mounted Unit Stables (Stoneham and Milton).

MDC had a long record of corruption. In 1987, Captain Nelson Barner  and Lt. Robert Clemente were convicted of cheating on a police exam. Officers from other cities, including the police chief of the city of Revere, were also convicted.   Former Metropolitan Police Capt. Gerald Clemente turned Commonwealth's witness to stave off having a prison term he was already serving lengthened, but was sentenced to another 15 years in prison

Massachusetts Convention Center Authority Police
The Massachusetts Convention Center Authority Police Department was formed during the creation of the authority in 1982. The department patrolled the Convention Center Authority owned property including the John B. Hynes Convention Center. The department was disbanded with the opening of the Boston Convention & Exhibition Center in 2004 and contracted security guards were hired to patrol properties. The contracted guards were replaced by the Massachusetts Convention Center Authority Public Safety Department in 2010.

Massachusetts Parking Authority Police
The Massachusetts Parking Authority Police patrolled the Boston Common Garage, Charles Street and parts of the Boston common, from 1975 until the Parking Authority was disbanded and the garage turned over to the Massachusetts Convention Center Authority in 1982. The patrol force slowly diminished through retirement and officers leaving for other agencies.

Worcester Airport Police
The Worcester Airport Police patrolled the grounds Worcester Regional Airport. The department was unique in that in provided both law enforcement and firefighting services to the airport. Officers of the Worcester Airport Police were both certified as Massachusetts Special State Police Officers as well as firefighters. The Worcester Airport Police were disbanded in the 2000's. Police services at the airport are now covered by the Massachusetts State Police and the Massachusetts Port Authority Department of Public Safety. Firefighting services are covered by the Massachusetts Port Authority Fire Rescue.

See also 
 List of law enforcement agencies in Massachusetts

External links 
 M.D.C. Police / Massachusetts Metropolitan Police History and Photos
 French and Electric Blue Pictures of the Men and Women who served with the Boston Police, Metropolitan District Commission Police Department, Capital Police and Registry Police Departments
 Massachusetts Acts of 1991 Chapter 412 - "An Act to Consolidate Certain Police Forces in the Commonwealth"
 Historic Massachusetts government license plates and history

Law enforcement agencies of Massachusetts
Defunct organizations based in Massachusetts
Law enforcement defunct
Lists of law enforcement agencies